Pathan is a synonym commonly used in South Asia to refer to the Pashtun people. It may also refer to:

People

Ethnic groups 
 Pathans in Bihar
 Pathans of Gujarat
 Pathans in India
 Pathans of Kashmir
 Pathans of Punjab
 Pathans of Madhya Pradesh
 Pathans of Rajasthan
 Pathans of Sindh
 Pathans in Sri Lanka
 Pathans of Uttar Pradesh
 Pathans of Tamil Nadu
 Ghori pathans, in India and Pakistan

Surname 
The surname is found among the Pashtun diaspora, mainly in India and Pakistan.
 Abdul Motaleb Khan Pathan, Bangladeshi politician
 Agha Javed Pathan (1972–2018), Pakistani doctor and political activist from Sindh
 Ahmadnoor Pathan (born 1996), Indian cricketer from Gujarat
 Alshaaz Pathan (born 1994), Indian cricketer from Gujarat
 Asad Pathan (born 1984), Indian cricketer from Gujarat
 Babashafi Pathan (born 1994), Indian cricketer from Gujarat
 Ghayasuddin Pathan, Pakistani politician from East Pakistan
 Hanif Pathan (1901–1989), Bangladeshi folklorist and antiquarian
 Irfan Pathan (born 1984), Indian cricketer from Gujarat
 Rayyan Pathan (born 1991), Canadian cricketer
 M.A. Pathan (born 1942), Indian businessman
 Mobarak Ali Pathan, Indian politician from Assam
 Naseeb Pathan (1956–2020), Indian politician from Uttar Pradesh
 Nurul Amin Khan Pathan, Bangladeshi politician
 Nuzhat Pathan (born 1965), Pakistan politician from Sindh
 Reshma Pathan, Indian stuntwoman and actress, known as the "Sholay Girl"
 Waris Pathan (born 1968), Indian lawyer and politician from Maharashtra
 Wuttikrai Pathan (born 1995), Thai football player
 Yusuf Pathan (born 1982), Indian cricketer from Gujarat
 Yusufkhan Mohamadkhan Pathan (born 1930), Indian academic and writer from Maharashtra
 Swab Phaoprathan or Sawab Khan Pathan, Pakistani-Thai businessman and politician
 Farooque or Akbar Hossain Pathan (born 1940), Bangladeshi actor and politician

Military
 40th Pathans, now the 16th Punjab Regiment, an infantry regiment raised in 1780
 Pathan Regiment (1948–1956), an infantry regiment of the Pakistan Army
 RFA War Pathan (X84), a 1923 tanker of the British Royal Fleet Auxiliary

Other uses
 Pashtun diaspora or Pathan diaspora, ethnic Pashtuns who live outside their traditional homeland of Pashtunistan in Aghanistan and Pakistan
 Pathan joke, type of ethnic joke
 Pathans (book), 1957 book by Olaf Caroe tracing the history of Pashtuns
 Pathaan (film), 2023 Indian spy film by Siddharth Anand
 Pandit Aur Pathan (Pandit and Pathan), 1977 Indian action film by Joginder Shelly
 Sunbeam Pathan, 1920s British piston aircraft engine

See also
 
 Patan (disambiguation)
 Pattani (disambiguation)
 Pashto (disambiguation)
 Parthian (disambiguation)
 Pashtunization or Pathanization, adapting to Pashtun language or culture
 Pathani, a Rajput clan of Uttarakhand, India
 Pathania, a Rajput clan of Himachal Pradesh, India